Ismat Gayibov Stadium, also referred as Bakikhanov Stadium is a multi-use stadium in Bakikhanov settlement of Baku, Azerbaijan. It is named in honor of Ismat Gayibov (1942–1991). It is currently used mostly for football matches. In February 2011, the president of Neftchi Baku football club Sadyg Sadygov announced that in domestic competitions Neftchi will host the rivals in Ismat Gayibov Stadium beginning from 2011–2012 season. The stadium holds approximately 5,000 seats. However, he states that an additional sector with 2,500 seats is to be constructed in the stadium.

References

See also
List of football stadiums in Azerbaijan

Football venues in Baku